Charles Eldon Fayne Robinson (born 1964) is a New Zealand Māori artist specialising in carving. Robinson has contributed to the carving of buildings on many marae in New Zealand as well as exhibiting his art in galleries and museums.

Biography 
Robinson was born in 1964 and grew up in the South Island town of Hokitika on the West Coast of New Zealand. His iwi are Kāti Māmoe, Kai Tahu, Ngāti Apa Ki Te Rā Tō and Ngāti Porou. Robinson trained in Māori carving at the New Zealand Māori Arts and Crafts Institute, Rotorua and graduated in 1984, He was just 17 when he got accepted and is one of only four from Ngāi Tahu who have attended. He was influenced to pursue Māori art from meeting the head weaver from the New Zealand Māori Arts and Crafts Institute, Emily Schuster, when he was younger.

Robinson has carved on meeting houses and at marae, including Te Tauraka Waka a Māui Marae in Bruce Bay, completed in 2005, and Arahura Marae near Hokitika, completed in 2013. The New Zealand national museum Te Papa Tongarewa owns three of his works in their collections.

Works and exhibitions

Wharenui as master carver
 2005 – Kaipō, Te Tauraka Waka a Māui Marae, Bruce Bay
 2010 – Wheke, Rāpaki (Te Wheke) Marae, Te Rāpaki-o-Te Rakiwhakaputa (with Riki Manuel)
 2013 – Tūhuru, Arahura Marae, Arahura

Exhibitions
 2003 – Kiwa-Pacific Connections, Vancouver, Canada, group exhibition
 2014 – Matatoki: Contemporary Māori Carving, group exhibition developed by Rotorua Museum
 2017 – Ka Nohoaka Toi, Toi Moaraki CoCA, Christchurch, group exhibition sponsored by Te Rūnanga o Ngāi Tahu
 2019 – Kura Pounamu: Our Treasured Stone, group exhibition curated by Te Papa Tongarewa

Public installations
 2010 – Te Pou Herenga Waka, Christchurch Civic Building, Worcester Boulevard, Christchurch
 2013 – Te Kaiwhakatere o Te Raki, pouwhenua, Scott Base, Antarctica
 2017 – Pounamu sculpture, Hanmer Springs Thermal Pools and Spa, Canterbury (with Caleb Robinson)
 2018 – Tāwhaki, Tūranga, Christchurch (with Caleb Robinson)
 2018 – Kāhui Whatu,  Tūranga, Christchurch
 2019 – Mana Motuhake, Victoria Square, Christchurch
 2020 – Carved memorial stone, Jacobs River
 2022 – Pou Tū te Raki o Te Maiharanui, Takapūneke, Banks Peninsula
 2022 – Te Kopikopiko o Te Waka, Gillespies Beach Road

Other
 2018 – Manly Warringah Sea Eagles jersey, worn by Manly for matches played in Christchurch
 2018 – Te Ātanga, Broadhurst–Shelford Trophy, contested in NRL matches between Manly Warringah and the New Zealand Warriors

References 

Living people
Māori culture
New Zealand Māori carvers
Ngāi Tahu people
1964 births
People from Hokitika
Ngāti Apa ki te Rā Tō people
Kāti Māmoe people
Ngāti Porou people